= Louis Taglianetti =

Louis "The Fox" Taglianetti (1903 – February 6, 1970) was a Rhode Island organized crime figure murdered by shotgun in front of his apartment building, the King Philip Arms, on Broad Street, Cranston, Rhode Island. A resident of the apartment complex and possible companion to Taglianetti, Elizabeth McKenna (age 26) was also murdered. Taglianetti had a previous 1967 conviction for income tax evasion and was an under indictment for the 1962 murder of underworld enforcer of John Jack Nazarian who was shot and killed on a Providence, Rhode Island street.
